Charles Friedman Haas (November 15, 1913 – May 12, 2011) was an American film and television director.

Biography
Haas was born in Chicago, Illinois and graduated from Harvard University. In 1935, he began his career at Universal Studios - where his stepfather was friends with studio chief Carl Laemmle - starting as an extra and eventually becoming assistant director and later a director of non-dramatic films. During World War II, he directed films for the Army Signal Corps. He turned to television in the 1950s, and during this period had a brief stint directing low-budget films. Ultimately, however, he settled in television, directing episodes of such popular series as Bonanza, The Alfred Hitchcock Hour, The Outer Limits, and The Man from U.N.C.L.E.

In 1952 he sued Walter Wanger for $53,000.

Credits

References

External links 
 

1913 births
2011 deaths
Artists from Chicago
American television directors
Film directors from Illinois
Harvard University alumni
People from Chicago
United States Army personnel of World War II